The  situated in a forested location in Iga, Mie Prefecture, Japan, is a museum dedicated to the history of the ninja and ninjutsu. It was established in 1964 and is located near Iga Ueno Castle. Jinichi Kawakami, who serves as the honorary director of the Iga-ryū Ninja Museum, is proclaimed to be the 21st head of Iga-ryū ninjutsu.

The museum's collection includes ancient ninjutsu writings analyzed scientifically along with ancient ninjutsu weapons. The museum has audiovisuals, models and extensive static displays of the weaponry and techniques employed by ninja. There are over 400 ninja tools on display, including shuriken used in the time of the ninja. The museum also features a model village with tours and demonstrations of its features. The museum allows visitors to throw ninja weapons and has ninja shows. It is a popular tourist attraction.

There is also a virtual version of the museum in Second Life.

On August 17, 2020, during the pre-dawn hours, thieves broke into the museum, and within three minutes, stole a 150 kg safe containing over one million yen of admission fees.

See also
 Iga-ryū
 Iga Ueno Ninja Festa

References

External links

 Official website
 Iga Ninja Museum in Second Life
 Iga Ninja Museum in Japan Guide
 Iga-ryu Ninja House and Museum (photo gallery)
 Current Iga-ryu Ninjutsu GrandMaster
 Iga Ryu Ninjutsu History

Ninjutsu
Museums established in 1964
Museums in Mie Prefecture
Military and war museums in Japan
Iga, Mie
1964 establishments in Japan